William (Bill) Martin was an American theatre director, playwright, and acting coach. His credits include Tony Award nominated rock opera The Lieutenant. He received a Drama Desk Award nomination for “Best Director.

He received his Ph.D. in theatre history from the University of Wisconsin. He then directed operas with many Metropolitan Opera notables including Jerome Hines and Eleanor Steber. 

His first Broadway venture was the Tony-nominated “Best Musical”  The Lieutenant for which he received a Drama Desk Award nomination for “Best Director ’74-75”. 

He directed more than 200 productions of both musical and non-musical theatre On- and Off-Broadway with performers such as Eartha Kitt, George Grizzard, Jessica Tandy, Hume Cronyn, Deborah Kerr, Frank Langella, Barry Bostwick, Salome Jens, Barbara Barrie, Jason Alexander, Maureen Anderman,  Patricia Richardson, Pamela Meyers, and Dick Shawn.

Bill died on December 17, 2017. 

https://www.dramabookshop.com/event/bill-martin-memorial

References

http://www.kidwhoplayedthepalace.net/director.html

External links
 

2017 deaths
Year of birth missing
American theatre directors
 University of Wisconsin–Madison College of Letters and Science alumni